"Where Are You Going, Where Have You Been?" is a frequently anthologized short story written by Joyce Carol Oates. The story first appeared in the Fall 1966 edition of Epoch magazine. It was inspired by three Tucson, Arizona murders committed by Charles Schmid, which were profiled in Life magazine in an article written by Don Moser on March 4, 1966. Oates said that she dedicated the story to Bob Dylan because she was inspired to write it after listening to his song "It's All Over Now, Baby Blue". The story was originally named "Death and the Maiden".

Plot 
Connie is an attractive, self-conscious 15-year-old girl. She has a strained relationship with her mother, who is jealous of her youth and beauty. Her mother constantly compares her to her sister, who is plain and hard-working. Her father is fairly distant and busy with work.

Connie enjoys going out with friends to the mall and "a drive-in restaurant where the older kids hung out". It is there, while enjoying the company of a boy, that she first sees Arnold Friend, a stranger in a gold convertible covered with cryptic writing. He says "Gonna get you, baby" to her, and she turns away from him. 

A while later, her family goes to a Sunday barbeque, leaving Connie home alone. Connie enjoys this time alone, listening to music and feeling happy with simply being alive. A car comes up on the driveway, and Connie comes down from her room to see who it is. It's Arnold Friend, who asks Connie to come along with him and a friend of his on a ride. Connie is initially unsure, and declines his offer. He insists that she actually does want to ride with them. He addresses her by name, and when she asks him how he knows it, he tells her he knows her family won't be home for a while, and that he has been asking around about her to other children. His friend merely listens to the music absentmindedly.

Arnold tries to convince Connie to come out of her house but she is still unsure and slightly unsettled. She suddenly thinks to ask how old he is; he deflects the question, finally telling her he's only 18. However, she can see that he is probably closer to, and maybe older than, 30. She begins to be truly frightened, and tells them to leave, but Arnold insists they won't leave till she comes with them. He declares that he is her lover, to her shocked terror, and she threatens to call the police. He says if she does, he'll come into the house. She rushes to lock the door, but he tells her he could easily break it down. She tells the men that her father is coming, and Arnold threatens to hurt her family when they return unless she comes out to the car. 

Overwhelmed with emotion, Connie retreats inside the house. Though she picks up the phone to call for help, she is unable to bring herself to use it; instead, she screams and wails in a panic until all her fear turns into emptiness. After Arnold continues gently, menacingly threatening her from outside the house, Connie accepts her fate and finally comes out, feeling nothing. It is heavily insinuated that he and the other man plan to take her to a secondary location to sexually assault or possibly murder her.

Characters
Connie: A beautiful girl who loves life. She is unsatisfied with her family, especially her mother, and seeks fulfillment elsewhere. She loves listening to music and is essentially a typical teenager.

Arnold Friend: A mysterious figure who visits Connie while her family is not at home and continuously demands that Connie to get in the car and go on a ride with him. He attempts to be smooth talking, yet his strange, performative and threatening behaviour make Connie uneasy and scared to be with him. 

Ellie: Arnold's friend who is very strange and sits in Arnold's car when they go to Connie's house. He listens to music and mostly stays back as Arnold tries to smooth talk his way to get Connie in the car with them.

Connie's Mother: Was once very beautiful when she was younger and is now a frustrating figure in Connie's life. They often argue. 

June: The older sister of Connie, who is basically the opposite of her. She does everything that her family asks of her, and is doted on by their mother.

Critical review
Considerable academic analysis has been written about the story, with scholars divided on whether it is intended to be taken literally or as allegory. Several writers focus on the series of numbers written on Friend's car, which he indicates are a code of some sort, but which is never explained:

"Now, these numbers are a secret code, honey," Arnold Friend explained. He read off the numbers 33, 19, 17 and raised his eyebrows at her to see what she thought of that, but she didn't think much of it.

Literary scholars have interpreted this series of numbers as different Biblical references (the title appears to have been taken from Judges 19:17), as an underlining of Friend's sexual deviancy, or as a reference to the ages of Friend and his victims.

The narrative has also been viewed as an allegory for initiation into sexual adulthood, an encounter with the devil, a critique of modern youth's obsession with sexual themes in popular music, or as a dream sequence.

Adaptations
The story was loosely adapted into the 1985 film Smooth Talk, starring Laura Dern and Treat Williams. Oates wrote an essay about the adaptation, "Where Are You Going, Where Have You Been?" and Smooth Talk: Short Story Into Film, in 1986.  

The story has also been cited as an inspiration for Rose McGowan's 2014 short film Dawn as well as The Blood Brothers' 2003 song "The Salesman, Denver Max".

References

External links
Complete text on Celestial Timepiece, an authorized Joyce Carol Oates Home Page

1966 short stories
American short stories
Works by Joyce Carol Oates
Works originally published in American magazines
Works originally published in literary magazines
Short stories adapted into films
Psychological horror
Horror short stories
Bob Dylan